The 2020 Paradise Jam was an early-season men's and women's college basketball tournament. The tournament, which began in 2000, was part of the 2020-21 NCAA Division I men's basketball season was held November 26–28. The tournaments are normally held at Saint Thomas, Virgin Islands at the Sports and Fitness Center on the campus of the University of the Virgin Islands. Due to the due to the COVID-19 pandemic the men's tournament was played at the Walter E. Washington Convention Center in Washington, D.C.  The 2020 women's edition of the women's tournament was cancelled due to the COVID-19 pandemic.

Men's tournament
\

Bracket

References

Paradise Jam Tournament
Paradise Jam